Shay Elias (born 25 February 1999) is an Israeli professional footballer who plays as a midfielder for Hapoel Be'er Sheva.

Eary life
Elias was born and raised in Herzliya, Israel, to an Israeli family of Sephardi Jewish descent.

Career statistics

Club

Notes

Honours

Club 
Hapoel Be'er Sheva
Super Cup: 2022

See also 
 List of Jewish footballers
 List of Jews in sports
 List of Israelis

References

1999 births
Living people
Jewish footballers
Israeli footballers
Israeli Jews
Sephardi Jews
Hapoel Tel Aviv F.C. players
Sektzia Ness Ziona F.C. players
Hapoel Be'er Sheva F.C. players
Israeli Premier League players
Liga Leumit players
Footballers from Herzliya
Israel international footballers
Israel youth international footballers
Association football defenders